'Vouchsafe, O Lord (Greek , Latin ) are the initial words of a prayer from the Matins and Vespers service of the Eastern Orthodox, and the former Prime and Compline of the Roman and Eastern Catholic Churches, and for Matins and Vespers (or Morning and Evening Prayer) of the Anglican, Lutheran, and other liturgical Protestant churches.

Orthodox Church

Matins 
For Sunday Orthros (Matins) this phrasing is employed as part of the Great Doxology:
 

For weekday Matins, the phrasing is used in the Lesser Doxology.

Vespers

Compline 
Vouchsafe, O Lord is sung as part of the Doxology of Small Compline. The rubrics for Great Compline, used during Lent and Holy Week, and the eves of certain great feasts, specifically direct that the Doxology be read, not sung.

Western Christianity 
The Greek liturgical text was imported into the closing of the Western Christian Te Deum, which is used in the Ambrosian Rite at Matins, and in other rites as a special hymn of thanksgiving, e.g. the Dettingen Te Deum composed by Handel to celebrate his patron George II of Great Britain's victory at the Battle of Dettingen. 

This usage was incorporated into liturgical Protestant rites at the time of the Reformation. In the 1549 prayer book, the first Book of Common Prayer, which was adapted from the Use of Sarum, it was required for both Mattins (sic) and Evensong,  but later became optional.

Protestant churches

Anglicanism 
The 1549 Book of Common Prayer collapsed the first three morning offices of the Catholic usage into one service called Mattins, and the latter two into Evensong, the traditional English-language name for Vespers. The other offices were abolished. In this book, the Te Deum, including the Vouchsafe, O Lord, was mandatory at Matins  The 1552 Book of Common prayer renamed these Morning Prayer and Evening Prayer, but continued the use of the Te Deum Laudamus, with Vouchasafe, O Lord, at Morning Prayer, with the option of substituting the 'Benedicite, omnia opera The 1662 Book of Common Prayer called for either the Te Deum Laudamus or the Benedicite to be recited (in English, despite their Latin incipits in the rubrics) after the Second Lesson at both Morning and Evening Prayer, thus the Vouchsafe, O Lord could be incorporated into one, or both at the option of the minister. The present Daily Office continues this use, with modernised language.

 Lutheranism 
Lutheran churches generally incorporate the Te Deum, which includes the Vouchsafe, Lord'' into Matins. Vouchsafe, O Lord is not used at Vespers in Lutheranism.

Notes

References 

Christian prayer